Interlaken Ost or Interlaken East is a railway station in the resort town of Interlaken in the Swiss canton of Bern. The station was previously known as Interlaken Zollhaus. The town has one other station, Interlaken West.

Interlaken Ost is an important railway junction at the meeting point of three railway lines, the Thunersee line of the BLS AG, the Brünig line of the Zentralbahn, and the Bernese Oberland railway (BOB). In addition to trains operated directly by the owners of these lines, the station is also reached by passenger trains of the Swiss Federal Railways, Deutsche Bahn, all of which operate over the Thunersee line.

The station provides an interchange with the local bus network provided by PostBus Switzerland and the regional bus line to Thun provided by Verkehrsbetriebe STI. Ships of the BLS-owned fleet on Lake Brienz serve a quay at Interlaken Ost, which they access via a navigable reach of the Aar river.

History 

In 1872, the standard gauge Bödelibahn railway opened from Därligen, on Lake Thun, to Interlaken, as Interlaken West station was then known. Two years later it was extended to Bönigen, on Lake Brienz, via a new station that was at first known as Interlaken Zollhaus. Initially this line was unconnected to the rest of the Swiss railway system, and merely served as a link between the steamships on both lakes. In 1893, the line reached Thun, with onward connections to Bern and beyond, eventually becoming part of the BLS.

In 1890, the metre gauge Berner Oberland railway opened, adopting Interlaken Zollhaus as the terminus of its route to the tourist destinations of Lauterbrunnen and Grindelwald. As a consequence, Interlaken Zollhaus became more important, and was renamed Interlaken Ost. At the same time the original Interlaken station became Interlaken West.

Meanwhile, in 1888, the metre gauge Brünig railway had opened between Brienz, on Lake Brienz, and Alpnachstad, on Lake Lucerne, thus providing a through steamer and rail connection from Interlaken to Lucerne. By 1916 the Brünig railway had reached Interlaken Ost from Brienz, and, together an earlier extension at its eastern end, provided a through rail route to Lucerne.

Standard gauge passenger service between Interlaken Ost and Bönigen ceased in 1969, although much of the line still exists in order to provide access to the BLS workshops as described above.

Operation

Layout 
The station is notable in that although lines converge on it from three directions, it is the terminus of every passenger service which enters it. There are no through services due to incompatibilities in gauge and electrical systems. The Thunersee line is standard gauge while the BOB and Brünig tracks are metre gauge. Additionally, there are two electrical systems; 1500 V DC for the BOB services and 15 kV AC for all the rest.

The platforms used by the Brünig line and BOB are terminal platforms and no metre gauge track exists west of the station.

None of the eight platform tracks are dual-gauge or dual-system, from the south side of the station, where the station building is located, the first three platform tracks are used by the BOB, the next two by the Brünig line, and the final three by the Thunersee line.

Services 
 the following services stop at Interlaken Ost:

 EuroCity / InterCity / Intercity Express (ICE): hourly or better service to Basel SBB. Most northbound trains terminate in Basel; a single EuroCity and an ICE continue to Hamburg-Altona and one ICE continues to Berlin Ostbahnhof.
 InterRegio / Regio: half-hourly service to Meiringen and hourly service to Lucerne.
 RegioExpress: four trains per day to Zweisimmen.
 Regio: half-hourly service to Lauterbrunnen and Grindelwald; trains operate combined between Interlaken Ost and Zweilütschinen.

References

External links 

 

Bernese Oberland Railway stations
BLS railway stations
Railway stations in the canton of Bern
Transport in Interlaken
Zentralbahn stations
Railway stations in Switzerland opened in 1874